The Financial Instruments Reference Database System (FIRDS) is published by the European Securities and Markets Authority (ESMA) and lists meta-information to all financial instruments included in the scope of MiFID II. This reference data is necessary to find metadata on a given financial instrument, uniquely identified by a so-called  International Securities Identification Number (ISIN).

Technical details
The Article 4(1)(20) of Directive 2014/65/EU (MiFID II) considers "investment firms dealing on own account when executing client orders over the counter (OTC) on an organised, frequent, systematic and substantial basis" systematic internaliser and requires them to report their trades. From this data, ESMA computes on a  best effort basis, the total volume and number of transactions executed within the EU.

According to the technical specification, new entries are published on a daily basis, every morning by 09:00 CET as XML-file. It contains the ISIN and the Market Identifier Code (MIC) as well as e.g. the 
Classification of Financial Instruments (CFI)-code and other information of the instrument.

The Legal Entity Identifier (LEI) code is conveyed by the ISSR. In the following example record in JSON format
, the ISSR is represented by "Issr" : "851WYGNLUQLFZBSYGB56". This LEI code can be looked up using the website https://search.gleif.org/#/search/ (see ). The LEI code corresponds to Commerzbank Aktiengesellschaft (Frankfurt) according to the LEI Registration Exception.

{
  "RefData": {
    "DebtInstrmAttrbts": {
      "NmnlValPerUnit": "2000",
      "IntrstRate": {
        "Fxd": "3.1415"
      },
      "MtrtyDt": "2020-01-01",
      "TtlIssdNmnlAmt": "200000000",
      "DebtSnrty": "SNDB"
    },
    "TradgVnRltdAttrbts": {
      "IssrReq": "false",
      "Id": "BMTF",
      "FrstTradDt": "2019-04-01T12:34:56.789"
    },
    "TechAttrbts": {
      "PblctnPrd": {
        "FrDt": "2019-04-04"
      },
      "RlvntCmptntAuthrty": "GB"
    },
    "FinInstrmGnlAttrbts": {
      "ClssfctnTp": "DBFNXX",
      "ShrtNm": "AVGO  3.625  10/16/24 c24 (URegS)",
      "FullNm": "AVGO 3  5/8  10/15/24 BOND",
      "NtnlCcy": "USD",
      "Id": "USU1109MAXXX",
      "CmmdtyDerivInd": "false"
    },
    "Issr": "851WYGNLUQLFZBSYGB56"
  }
}

See also
 Request for quote
 Legal Entity Identifier
 International Securities Identification Number
 Markets in Financial Instruments Directive 2004
 Approved Publication Arrangement (APA)

References

External links
Microfinance Blog
FIRDS format description
Data for the systematic internaliser calculations

Financial metadata